Dolf Roks (born 21 November 1962 in Zierikzee) is a former amateur football player from the Netherlands. As a football coach he had a long time spell with Sparta Rotterdam, before being fired on 22 January 2003.

See also
2002–03 Sparta Rotterdam season

References
Profile

1962 births
Living people
Dutch football managers
Dutch footballers
Footballers from Zierikzee
RBC Roosendaal managers
Sparta Rotterdam managers
Association footballers not categorized by position
Sparta Rotterdam non-playing staff